Baron Bolton, of Bolton Castle in the County of York, is a title in the Peerage of Great Britain. It was created in 1797 for the Tory politician Thomas Orde-Powlett, who had previously served as Chief Secretary for Ireland. Born Thomas Orde, he was the husband of Jean Mary Browne-Powlett, illegitimate daughter of Charles Powlett, 5th Duke of Bolton, who had entailed the greater part of his extensive estates to her in default of male issue of his younger brother Harry Powlett, 6th Duke of Bolton.

John Orde, younger brother of the first Baron Bolton, was an Admiral in the Royal Navy and was created a baronet, of Morpeth in the County of Northumberland, in 1790.

The sixth Duke died without male heirs in 1794 when the dukedom became extinct and the Bolton estates passed to Thomas Orde in right of his wife. In 1795 he assumed the additional surname of Powlett. He was succeeded by his eldest son, the second Baron. He briefly represented Yarmouth in the House of Commons. On his death the title passed to his nephew, the third Baron. His grandson, the fifth Baron, sat as a Conservative Member of Parliament for Richmond and served as Lord Lieutenant of the North Riding of Yorkshire.

In 2018, the title is held by the latter's great-grandson, Harry Algar Nigel [Orde-Powlett], 8th Baron Bolton, who succeeded his father. His residence in 2016 was Wensley Hall, Wensley, Leyburn. The family seat is Bolton Hall near Leyburn in North Yorkshire. His son Thomas Peter Algar Orde-Powlett MC is the current heir.

Barons Bolton (1797)

Thomas Orde-Powlett, 1st Baron Bolton (1746–1807)
William Orde-Powlett, 2nd Baron Bolton (1782–1850)
William Henry Orde-Powlett, 3rd Baron Bolton (1818–1895)
William Thomas Orde-Powlett, 4th Baron Bolton (1845–1922)
William George Algar Orde-Powlett, 5th Baron Bolton (1869–1944)
Nigel Amyas Orde-Powlett, 6th Baron Bolton (1900–1963)
Richard William Algar Orde-Powlett, 7th Baron Bolton (1929–2001)
Harry Algar Nigel Orde-Powlett, 8th Baron Bolton (b. 1954)

The heir apparent is the present holder's eldest son, Capt. Thomas Peter Algar Orde-Powlett MC (b. 1979), who won the Military Cross in Iraq in 2003. He now runs Bolton Castle with his wife Katie.

His heir apparent is his son, Hector Percy Algar Orde-Powlett (b. 2009).

See also

Barons Scrope of Bolton (1371)
Richard Scrope, 1st Baron Scrope of Bolton (c. 1327–1403)
Roger Scrope, 2nd Baron Scrope of Bolton (d. 1403)
Richard Scrope, 3rd Baron Scrope of Bolton (1393–1420)
Henry Scrope, 4th Baron Scrope of Bolton (1418–1459)
John Scrope, 5th Baron Scrope of Bolton (1435–1498)
Henry Scrope, 6th Baron Scrope of Bolton (d. 1506)
Henry Scrope, 7th Baron Scrope of Bolton (c. 1480–1533)
John Scrope, 8th Baron Scrope of Bolton (d. 1549)
Henry Scrope, 9th Baron Scrope of Bolton (c. 1534–1591)
Thomas Scrope, 10th Baron Scrope of Bolton (c. 1567–1609)
Emanuel Scrope, 1st Earl of Sunderland, 11th Baron Scrope of Bolton (1584–1630)
His daughter Mary (died 1680) married, Charles Paulet, sixth Marquess of Winchester and later created first Duke of Bolton (c. 1630 – 1699).
Other titles:
Duke of Bolton
Campbell-Orde baronets

Bolton lands
According to John Bateman's The Great Landowners of Great Britain and Ireland, 1883, the 3rd Lord Bolton (1818–1895) of the day, of Hackwood Park, Basingstoke, &tc, and the London clubs Carlton and Boodle's, had in the North Riding of Yorkshire  returning £ per year and in Hampshire , returning £ (converted from guineas).

Notes

References 

Kidd, Charles, Williamson, David (editors). Debrett's Peerage and Baronetage (1990 edition). New York: St Martin's Press, 1990, 

Baronies in the Peerage of Great Britain
Noble titles created in 1797